The 2013 New Mexico Lobos football team represented the University of New Mexico in the 2013 NCAA Division I FBS football season. The Lobos were led by second-year head coach Bob Davie. They played their home games at University Stadium and were members of the Mountain Division of the Mountain West Conference. They finished the season 3–9, 1–7 in Mountain West play to finish in sixth place in the Mountain Division.

Schedule

Game summaries

UTSA

at UTEP

at Pittsburgh

UNLV

New Mexico State

at Wyoming

Utah State

at San Diego State

Air Force

Colorado State

at Fresno State

at Boise State

2013 Annual team awards

Each year members of the Lobos football team who distinguished themselves during the football season are honored at the Lobos Annual Football Awards Banquet. For the 2013 football season, the following team members were honored: Bill Brannin Most Valuable Player Award: Kasey Carrier; Reese Hill Offensive Most Valuable Player Award: Kasey Carrier; Clyde Hill Most Improved Player Award: Cole Gautsche; Colonel H.J. Golightly Defensive Most Valuable Player Award: Dallas Bollema; Chuck Cummins Most Inspirational Player Award: Dillon Farrell; 1st Team Award (Unselfish Devotion to the Team): Mat McBain; Outstanding Special Teams Player: Carlos Wiggins; Most Valuable Offensive Scout Team Player Award: Romell Jordan; Most Valuable Defensive Scout Team Player Award: Tayo Adewon; The Red Menace Award: Dillon Farrell; New Mexico Man Award: Reece White; Academic Achievement Award: Garrett Adcock; Academic Most Improved Award: Devonta Tabannah; Big Brother of the Year Award: Dillon Farrell.

About the Clyde and Reese Hill awards: The Hill brothers were members of the Lobos football team prior to WWII (Clyde, 1941; Reese, 1939–1941). Both men were described by UNM coaches as extraordinary athletes. Clyde came to UNM after serving in the U.S. Marines where he was a boxing champion. At UNM, he was a member of the university boxing team and made the football team as a walk-on. Reese came to UNM as a highly touted recruit. A "legend" in northern New Mexico high school sports, he lettered in four sports at St. Michael's High School in Santa Fe. While at UNM, he was a member of the university's track, basketball and football teams. The Hill brothers were described by a contemporary as being "He-Men, the kind of men who could throw you across a room." After the bombing of Pearl Harbor, Clyde and Reese left UNM to enlist in the military. Clyde died as a U.S. Marine F4U fighter pilot at Okinawa with the rank of captain, while Reese—a U.S. Army first lieutenant and glider pilot—survived the invasion of Normandy only to be killed when his glider was shot down over the Netherlands.

References

New Mexico
New Mexico Lobos football seasons
New Mexico Lobos football